Crest or CREST may refer to:

Buildings

The Crest (Huntington, New York), a historic house in Suffolk County, New York
"The Crest", an alternate name for 63 Wall Street, in Manhattan, New York
Crest Castle (Château Du Crest), Jussy, Switzerland
Crest House, a building, now in ruins, at the summit of Mount Evans in Colorado 
Crest Theatre, a historic theatre in downtown Sacramento, California
Crest Theatre, formerly Majestic Crest Theatre, Los Angeles, California
Crest Theatre, in Old School Square, Delray Beach, Florida

Business or commerce
Crest (toothpaste), a brand of toothpaste
Crest Audio, an American manufacturer of power amplifiers and mixing consoles
Crest Animation Productions, an animation studio in Burbank, California
Crest Animation Studios, an animation studio in India
Crest Books, an imprint of now defunct Fawcett Publications
Crest Hotels, a defunct hotel chain in the UK
Crest Manufacturing Company, producer of the Crestmobile automobile in the 1900s
CREST (securities depository), a dematerialised securities depository and settlement service of the UK and Ireland
Center for Research in Economics and Statistics, Paris, France

Education
Crest Boys' Academy, a former secondary school in Neasden in the London Borough of Brent
Crest Girls' Academy, a former secondary school in Neasden
Crest High School (Kansas), Colony, Kansas
Crest High School (North Carolina), Boiling Springs, North Carolina
E-ACT Crest Academy, a secondary school which replaced Crest Boys' and Girls' Academies and Crest Sixth Form in 2014
Centre for Renewable Energy Systems Technology, Loughborough University, UK
The Consortium for Research Excellence, Support and Training (CREST), an organisation that provides training and research support for UK universities

Music
The Crest (album), a 2010 album by Axel Rudi Pell
The Crest (band), a gothic metal band from Oslo, Norway
The Crests, a late 1950s R&B doo wop band whose big hit was "16 Candles"
Crest Records, an American record label from 1954 to 1963
Crest, a 2022 album by Bladee and Ecco2K

Places
Crest, California, an unincorporated community, United States
Crest, Drôme, a commune in the Drôme département, France
Crest, Georgia, an unincorporated community, United States
Crest, Missouri, an unincorporated community, United States
Crest Mountain, British Columbia, Canada
Le Crest, a commune in the Puy-de-Dôme département, France

Science and medicine
Crest (anatomy), various anatomical features
Crest (feathers), a prominent feature exhibited by several bird and other dinosaur species on their heads
Cresting (or fasciation), condition of abnormal growth in vascular plants
Crest (hydrology), the highest level above a certain datum or reference point that a river will reach in a certain amount of time
Mountain crest, a geological feature
Crest (physics), the section of a wave that rises above an undisturbed position
Crest factor, a dimensionless number quantifying the shapes of waves
CREST syndrome, a limited form of the disease scleroderma

Ships
, a US Navy minesweeper from 1917 to 1919
Crest (1900 steamboat), which operated in Puget Sound on the west coast of the United States

Symbols
Crest (heraldry), a component of a heraldic display
Crest (sports), a common word for the logo used by a sports club

Other uses
Crest Airpark, a public airport in the state of Washington
Crests (Digimon), powerful artifacts in the Digimon Adventure anime series
Crest (video game), an indirect god game by Eat Create Sleep
Jacques-Barthélemy Micheli du Crest (1690–1766), Genevan military engineer, physicist and cartographer

See also
Crested (duck breed), a breed of domestic duck
Cresting (architecture), ornamentation attached to the ridge of a roof, cornice, coping or parapet
Fasciation or cresting, in botany, abnormal growth of a plant